Lydia Rose Bewley (born 9 October 1985) is an English actress known for her roles as Jane in The Inbetweeners Movie and The Inbetweeners 2, Metella in Plebs and Bunny in Drifters. She trained at Oxford School of Drama before working in repertory theatre.

Early life
Bewley was born and raised in Leicestershire, one of four children with brothers Charlie, James and Andrew. Her mother is an opera singer and her older brother Charlie played the vampire Demetri in The Twilight Saga films. She was educated at Our Lady's Convent School in Loughborough, and Oakham School, Rutland. She graduated from the Oxford School of Drama in 2007.

Career
After spending two years working as a children's entertainer, Bewley was cast as a supporting character in The Inbetweeners Movie. She appeared as "Metella" in the ITV2 sitcom Plebs from 2013 to 2014; and as "Bunny", one of the lead characters in the E4 sitcom Drifters. She was a member of the ensemble cast of I Live with Models (2015–2017).

Personal life
Bewley is an Honorary Ambassador for the East Midlands Rainbows Children's Hospice.

Filmography

Film

Television

Theatre

References

External links
 
 Lydia Rose Bewley at Vogue world of curvy actresses

English film actresses
Living people
1985 births
People from Leicester
People from Loughborough
People educated at Loughborough Grammar School
People educated at Oakham School
Alumni of the Oxford School of Drama
21st-century English actresses
English television actresses
English stage actresses
Actresses from Leicestershire